Robert Monier  (20 February 1885 – 6 December 1944) was a French sailor and national rugby union player. He was won the Silver medal  along with  Albert Weil and Félix Picon in Sailing at the 1920 Summer Olympics – 6.5 Metre race.

References

External links
 
 
 

1885 births
1944 deaths
French male sailors (sport)
Olympic sailors of France
Olympic silver medalists for France
Olympic medalists in sailing
Sailors at the 1920 Summer Olympics – 6.5 Metre
Medalists at the 1920 Summer Olympics
France international rugby union players
Sportspeople from Bordeaux
French rugby union players
Stade Bordelais players
Rugby union props